Park Ho-Jin  (Hangul: 박호진; Hanja: 朴虎珍; born 22 October 1976) is a South Korean football player and football coach who plays for Gwangju FC.

Club career statistics

External links
 

1976 births
Living people
Association football goalkeepers
South Korean footballers
Suwon Samsung Bluewings players
Gimcheon Sangmu FC players
Gwangju FC players
Gangwon FC players
K League 1 players
Sportspeople from Gyeonggi Province
Yonsei University alumni